Once in a Lifetime: The Best of Talking Heads is a compilation album by Talking Heads. A single disc version of Sand in the Vaseline: Popular Favorites, it was released outside of the US and UK in place of that album.

Track listing
All songs written by David Byrne, Chris Frantz, Jerry Harrison, Tina Weymouth except as noted:
 "Psycho Killer" (Byrne, Frantz, Weymouth) (from Talking Heads: 77, 1977)
 "Take Me to the River" (Al Green, Mabon "Teenie" Hodges) (from More Songs About Buildings and Food, 1978)
 "Once in a Lifetime"  (Byrne, Brian Eno, Frantz, Harrison, Weymouth) (from Remain in Light, 1980)
 "Burning Down the House" (from Speaking in Tongues, 1983)
 "This Must Be the Place (Naive Melody)" (from Speaking in Tongues)
 "Slippery People (Live)" (from Stop Making Sense, 1984)
 "Life During Wartime (Live)" (from Stop Making Sense)
 "And She Was" (Byrne) (from Little Creatures, 1985)
 "Road to Nowhere" (Byrne) (from Little Creatures)
 "Wild Wild Life" (Byrne) (from True Stories, 1986)
 "Blind" (from Naked, 1988)
 "(Nothing But) Flowers" (from Naked)
 "Sax and Violins" (from the Until the End of the World soundtrack, 1991)
 "Lifetime Piling Up" (unreleased single, 1987)

Charts

Certifications

References

Albums produced by Jerry Harrison
Albums produced by David Byrne
Talking Heads compilation albums
1992 greatest hits albums
Albums produced by Brian Eno
Albums produced by Tony Bongiovi
Albums produced by Nick Launay
Albums produced by Steve Lillywhite
EMI Records compilation albums